This is the discography for American Grammy-nominated jazz saxophonist, composer, producer, arranger, and songwriter Dave Koz which consists of 19 studio albums, one collaboration album, four live albums, one compilation album, one video album, and 64 singles (47 a lead artist and 17 as a featured artist).

Albums

Studio albums

Solo albums

Collaborations

Live albums

Compilations

Video albums

Singles

As lead artist

As featured artist

Other appearances

Footnotes

References

External links
Official website
Dave Koz discography at AllMusic
Dave Koz discography at Discogs
Dave Koz discography at MusicBrainz

Discographies of American artists
Jazz discographies